Erymus gracilis is a species of rove beetle widely spread in Oriental region. It is found throughout China, Sri Lanka, India, Bhutan, Thailand, Malaysia, Laos, Indonesia, Myanmar, and Nepal.

Description
Maximum body length is about 4.08 mm. Body nearly cylindrical and dark brown in color. Maxillary palpi, labial palpi, legs and last abdominal segment are pale brown. Head subrectangular where widest at mid-length of eyes. Dorsal integument is glossy, without any micropunctures and microsculpture. Eyes are large, and distinctly longer than half length of tempora. Epistoma is relatively narrow. Antenna scape is stout, and thickened apically. There are three subsequent antennomeres. Pronotum subrectangular, and distinctly elongate. Mesoscutellum glossy with a pair of small punctures.

References 

Staphylinidae
Insects of Sri Lanka
Insects of India
Insects described in 1895